Peter Tordenskjold (1691–1720) was a Dano-Norwegian naval hero.

Tordenskjold or Tordenskiold may also refer to:
 Tordenskiold (noble family)
 Tordenskjold Township, Otter Tail County, Minnesota
 Tordenskjoldberget,  a mountain on the island of Kongsøya in Kong Karls Land, Svalbard, Norway
 Tordenskiold Oak, a legendary old tree in Horten, Norway
 Danish ironclad Tordenskjold
 HNoMS Tordenskjold, a Norwegian coastal defence ship
 Tordenskjold-class coastal defence ships